Port Royal is the former capital city of Jamaica.

Port Royal or Port Royale may also refer to:

Institutions
 Port-Royal-des-Champs, an abbey near Paris, France, which spawned influential schools and writers of the 17th century
 Port-Royal Abbey, Paris, an inner-city abbey founded by Port-Royal-des-Champs
 Order of Port Royal, modern Old Catholic order inspired by Port-Royal-des-Champs

Geography

Canada
 Habitation at Port-Royal (1605-1613), the location of France's first successful settlement in what is now Western Nova Scotia, now a National Historic Site of Canada.
 Port Royal, Annapolis County, Nova Scotia, a rural community in  Nova Scotia near the site of the Habitation at Port-Royal.
 Port-Royal (Acadia) (1632-1710): a nearby fortification where the French built an unnamed Vauban earthwork which became Fort Anne. It was eventually captured by the Anglo-Americans and renamed:
 Annapolis Royal, Nova Scotia, a town which exists today.
 Port Royal, Richmond County, Nova Scotia, a rural community in eastern Nova Scotia, unrelated to the above.
 Port Royal, a neighbourhood in Queensborough, New Westminster, British Columbia.

France
 Port-Royal (Paris RER), a rapid transit station in Paris, located on Port-Royal boulevard, near the site of the former Port-Royal Abbey

United States
 Port Royal, Kentucky, an unincorporated community in Henry County
 Port Royal, Mississippi, a ghost town
 Port Royal, Pennsylvania, a borough in Juniata County
 Port Royal Sound, an inlet of the Atlantic Ocean in Beaufort County, South Carolina
Port Royal Island, an island in Beaufort County, South Carolina
Port Royal, South Carolina, a town on Port Royal Island, in Beaufort County
 Port Royal, Virginia, a town

Jamaica
 Port Royal, a Spanish colony taken over by the British

Art, entertainment, and media

Games
 Port Royale: Gold, Power and Pirates (2003), a simulation PC game by Ascaron Entertainment
 Port Royale 2: Construction, Cartels and Conquest (2004), a sequel game by Ascaron Entertainment for PC
 Port Royale 3: Pirates & Merchants (2012), a video game by Gaming Minds Studios for PC, Xbox 360, and PS3
 Port Royale 4 (2020), a sequel game by Gaming Minds Studios for PC, Xbox One, PS4, and Nintendo Switch
 Port Royal (2014), a push-your-luck card game with engine-building elements

Literature
 Port-Royal Grammar (1660), a grammar textbook by clerics from Port-Royal-des-Champs Abbey
 Port-Royal Logic (1662), a logic textbook by clerics from Port-Royal-des-Champs Abbey
 Port-Royal (1837-1859), a multi-volume study of the abbey of Port-Royal-des-Champs and Jansenism by Charles Augustin Sainte-Beuve
 Port-Royal (1954), a play by Henry de Montherlant set at the Port-Royal Abbey of Paris during the formulary controversy

Music
 Port Royal (album), an album by metal band Running Wild
 port-royal (band), an Italian electronica and post-rock band

Battles
 Battle of Port Royal, a naval battle of the American Civil War at Port Royal, South Carolina
 Siege of Port Royal (1710), capture of French capital of Acadia (present day Nova Scotia and New Brunswick) by the British

Brands
 Port Royal, a brand of beer made by Cerveceria Hondurena, a SABMiller brands subsidiary located in San Pedro Sula, Honduras
 Port Royal Cigars, a tobacco products company in New Zealand

Enterprises
 Le Port-Royal Apartments, an apartment building in Montreal, Quebec
 Port Royal Experiment, a program begun during the American Civil War in which former slaves successfully worked on the land abandoned by plantation owners in Beaufort County, South Carolina
 Port Royal Golf Course, a golf club located in Southampton, Bermuda, notable for hosting the PGA Grand Slam of Golf in 2009 and 2010
 Port Royal Speedway, a dirt racetrack in Port Royal, Pennsylvania

Transportation and vessels
 , three ships of the Royal Navy
 Port Royal Railroad, a defunct railroad that ran from Port Royal, South Carolina, to Yemassee, South Carolina
 USS Port Royal (1862), a sidewheel steamer gunboat commissioned in 1862, active in the Civil War, and decommissioned in 1866
 USS Port Royal (CG-73), a guided missile cruiser commissioned in 1994, the last US cruiser built in the 20th century